5 cm is an Indonesian drama film, directed by Rizal Mantovani and starring Herjunot Ali and Fedi Nuril. It is based on the novel 5 cm by Donny Dhirgantoro, and was released on December 12, 2012.

Soundtrack album
5 cm Original Motion Pictures Soundtrack is a mini album released by Nidji and released by Musica Studios on January 4, 2013. The album is not officially sold in physical format, but are available only through digital podcast services such as iTunes and MelOn.

Awards
In the 2013 Indonesian Film Festival, 5 cm competed with another box office at the time, Habibie & Ainun, in many nominations. Yudi Datau was awarded as the best cinematographer.

References

External links

Indonesian drama films
Films based on Indonesian novels
2012 drama films
2010s Indonesian-language films